Émile Eisman-Semenowsky, born Emil Eismann (19 September 1853, St. Petersburg - 31 July 1918, Paris) was a French painter of Russian birth and Polish, possibly Jewish, ancestry. He specialized in portraits of women; including many in the Orientalist style.

Life and work
There are few documented sources concerning his life and education, although it is known that he emigrated at an early age and arrived in Paris in the 1880s, where he began doing sentimentalized portraits of upper class women, tailored to bourgeois tastes. 

He also worked as an assistant to the Belgian painter, Jan van Beers; serving as a witness in a case involving two critics who accused Van Beers of copying from photographs. 

In addition to portraits, he did some nudes and genre scenes. He often worked in Algeria, beginning in 1890; depicting women in traditional costume, as well as their daily dress. Many of his paintings are in private collections in the United States.

References

External links 

1853 births
1918 deaths
19th-century French painters
French portrait painters
French orientalists
Russian emigrants to France
French people of Polish-Jewish descent
Painters from Saint Petersburg
20th-century French painters